At the 1896 Summer Olympics in Athens, an unofficial football event was held on 12 April between two representative teams of Greece and Denmark at the Podilatodromio. The International Olympic Committee (IOC) does not recognize the existence of an official football tournament at the 1896 Olympics and the majority of works devoted to the 1896 Olympic Games do not actually mention a football competition; however, there is incontrovertible evidence that the aforementioned match was played as either a part of the (unofficial) programme, or as a "demonstration sport" during the Olympic Games.

The reason why this match was more or less ignored was because of a recommendation from Crown Prince Constantine, the chairman of the 1896 Olympic Organizing Committee, who publicly said that the sports which were not part of the official Olympic programme should not be mentioned, and thus, the football match was not reported anywhere. As a result, the final score of the game remains uncertain with various sources agreeing it was either a 9-0 or a 15-0 victory for the Danish. Remarkably, it was Prince Constantine's younger brother, George, Prince of both Greece and Denmark, refereed the football match.

Background 
The organization of the football tournament was directly raised during the first-ever IOC meeting held in November 1894 to set the program for the 1896 Games, and thus, an Olympic football tournament was originally planned to be held at the games, and the Organizing Committee of the Games even learned that four foreign clubs were interested in sending a team, and therefore decided on 17 March to include football on the programme. However, none of the four clubs came to Athens, and so, on 28 March, in a meeting of the Greek Olympic Organizing Committee, it was decided to remove football from the official Olympic programme due to the small number of participants.

The deadline for both federations and clubs to sign up was six days later, and on 3 April the Secretary-General had only received name lists from Greece and Denmark. Football was thus (like boxing, cricket, horse racing, rowing and sailing) only unofficially part of the Olympic programme in Athens in 1896.

Venue 

All the matches were hosted at "Neo Phaliron Velodrome" (or "Podilatodromio"), originally a velodrome and sports arena in the Neo Faliro District of Piraeus. This venue was also used for the track cycling events at the 1896 Olympics.

The match attracted a significant number of spectators at the time, over 6,000 people attended the Velodrome.

Squad 
The Greek team was the (Sports Club Athinaikos Athlitikos Syllogos), one of the pioneers of Greek football and it also represented Greece at the Track Cycling Competitions which were also conducted at the Podilatodromio. Denmark was represented by players of Københavns Roklub and Østerbro Boldklub, two clubs who had been among the founding members of the Danmarks Idrætsforbund (DIF, Danish Sports Confederation), founded on 14 February 1896, and Roklub's president, Eugen Schmidt, became DIF's first president. Kobenhavns Roklub had a good football team in the 1890s, so they received an invitation from the founder of the modern Olympic games, Pierre de Coubertin, to participate in the 1896 Olympics, and apparently, they sent just two players to represent them, Eugen Schmidt and Holger Nielsen, so the rest of the team was made up of Danish sailors and businessman, members of the Østerbro Boldklub, who happened to be in Athens. Both Schmidt and Nielsen competed in other events at the 1896 Summer Olympics, with Schmidt competing in the 100 metres event, and in the military rifle event, while Nielsen competing in fencing, firearms and discus events.

 Athinaikos Athlitikos Syllogos: Pavlos Kountouriotis, Kavalieratos Anninos, Konstantinos Zervoudakis, Dimitrios Petrokokkinos, Georgios Karamanos, Stavros Antoniadis, Spyridon Angonakis, P. Gasparis, Epamaindos Harilaos and Georgios Nikolopoulos.
  KR and ØB: Eugen Schmidt and Holger Nielsen.

The match

Tournament ranking

Dispute
In 2017, Olympic historians Volker Kluge and Bill Mallon published the results of an investigation into a possible football game at the 1896 Olympic Games and concluded that;

"Football is sometimes listed as having been contested in 1896 as an exhibition sport or demonstration sport at the  Olympic Games, although no such designation existed at the time of the 1896 Olympics. 
Supposedly, a match between a Greek club and a Danish club was conducted. No 1896 source supports this and we think this is most likely an error that has been perpetrated in multiple texts. No such match occurred."

Notes

References

1896
1896 Summer Olympics events
1896
inter
Denmark at the Men's Olympic Football Tournament